Entanglements is the third full-length album from indie rock ensemble Parenthetical Girls.

Track listing
"Four Words" - 3:10
"Avenue of Trees" - 3:17
"Unmentionables" - 1:51
"Gut Symmetries" - 3:58
"A Song for Ellie Greenwich" - 2:55
"Young Eucharists" - 3:44
"Entanglement" - 1:38
"Abandoning" - 1:42
"The Former" - 3:16
"Windmills of Your Mind" - 2:44
"This Regrettable End" - 4:26

Personnel
 Zac Pennington
 Jherek Bischoff
 Matthew Carlson
 Edward Crichton
 Rachael Jensen

References

External links
 Themes for Entanglements (a band-submitted mixtape of influences)

Parenthetical Girls albums
2008 albums
Tomlab albums